The men's long jump was an event at the 1956 Summer Olympics in Melbourne, Australia. The qualifying stage and the final both were held on the second day of the track and field competition, on Saturday November 24, 1956. Thirty-two athletes from 21 nations competed. The maximum number of athletes per nation had been set at 3 since the 1930 Olympic Congress. The event was won by Greg Bell of the United States, the nation's seventh consecutive and 12th overall victory in the event. Jorma Valkama's bronze medal was Finland's first medal in the men's long jump.

Summary

The number one qualifier was Henryk Grabowski, but he was unable to produce similar results in the final. The world record was not in the discussion, with world record holder Jesse Owens sitting in the stands more than 21 years after he had jumped 8.13m. Owens also set the Olympic record at 8.06m in 1936. #2 qualifier John Bennett took the first round lead with a 7.68m jump. Dmitriy Bondarenko was in second with a 7.44m and in the first Olympics for Nigeria, Karim Olowu was in third with 7.28m. In the second round, Gregory Bell hit the winner, . In the third round, Jorma Valkama jumped into bronze position with a 7.48m. In the fourth round Bell reaffirmed his position with a 7.77m.

Background

This was the 13th appearance of the event, which is one of 12 athletics events to have been held at every Summer Olympics. The returning finalists from the 1952 Games were bronze medalist Ödön Földessy of Hungary, tenth-place finisher Masaji Tajima of Japan, and eleventh-place finisher Neville Price of South Africa.

Israel, Liberia, Pakistan, Uganda, and Uruguay each made their first appearance in the event. The United States appeared for the 13th time, the only nation to have long jumpers at each of the Games thus far.

Competition format

The 1956 competition used the two-round format with divided final introduced in 1952. The qualifying round gave each competitor three jumps to achieve a distance of 7.15 metres; if fewer than 12 men did so, the top 12 (including all those tied) would advance. The final provided each jumper with three jumps; the top six jumpers received an additional three jumps for a total of six, with the best to count (qualifying round jumps were not considered for the final).

Records

Prior to this competition, the existing world and Olympic records were as follows.

No new world or Olympic records were set for this event.

Schedule

All times are Australian Eastern Standard Time (UTC+10)

Results

Qualifying

For the qualifying round, competitors needed to hit the standard of 7.15 meters in order to reach the final, with a minimum of 12 competitors making the final. Since 13 athletes hit the standard, no extra berths were given for the final. After an athlete met the standard in the qualifying round, they were not required to finish their three jumps, denoted by a dash in the table. A foul is denoted by an "X".

Final

The final round included all 13 competitors who had qualified earlier that day by reaching the mark of 7.15 meters. The finals format was set up in two sections. All 13 athletes made three jumps, and all but the best six jumpers were eliminated. Finally, three more jumps were contested for the top six; however, any jump made over all six attempts counted towards the final ranking. A dash means that the jumper elected not to attempt that round.

References

External links
 Official report
 Results

M
Long jump at the Olympics
Men's events at the 1956 Summer Olympics